A variable gauge system allows railway vehicles in a train to travel across a break of gauge between two railway networks with different track gauges.

For through operation, a train must be equipped with special bogies holding variable gauge wheelsets containing a variable gauge axle (VGA). The gauge is altered by driving the train through a gauge changer or gauge changing facility. In effect, the track widens or narrows.

As the train passes through the gauge changer, the wheels are unlocked, are moved closer together, or further apart, and are then re-locked. Installed variable gauge systems exist within the internal network of Spain, and are installed on international links between Spain/France (Spanish train), Sweden/Finland (Swedish train), Poland/Lithuania (Polish train) and Poland/Ukraine (Polish train).

A system for changing gauge without the need to stop is in widespread use for passenger traffic in Spain, for services run on a mix of dedicated high-speed lines (using Standard gauge) and older lines (using Iberian gauge). Similar systems for freight traffic are still in their infancy, as the higher axle weight increases the technological challenge. Although several alternatives exist, including transferring freight, replacing individual wheels and axles, truck exchange, transporter flatcars or the simple transshipment of freight or passengers, they are impractical, thus a cheap and fast system for changing gauge would be beneficial for cross-border freight traffic.

Alternative names include Gauge Adjustable Wheelsets (GAW), Automatic Track Gauge Changeover System (ATGCS/TGCS), Rolling Stock Re-Gauging System (RSRS), Rail Gauge Adjustment System (RGAS), Shifting wheelset, Variable Gauge Rolling Truck, track gauge change and track change wheelset.

Overview 
Variable gauge axles help solve the problem of a break-of-gauge without having to resort to dual gauge tracks or transshipment. Systems allow the adjustment between two gauges. No gauge changer designs supporting more than two gauges are used.

Systems 

There are several variable gauge axle systems:
 Talgo-RD (from Talgo).
 The Talgo system has been in revenue service in Portbou and Irun, on the Spanish-French border, since 1969
 It is used on the Strizh train (swift) between Moscow and Berlin.
 From 2014 for freight wagons up to 22.5t axleloads 
 CAF-BRAVA (from Construcciones y Auxiliar de Ferrocarriles)
 The BRAVA system was originally designed in 1968 by the Vevey Company in Switzerland. The system was originally called the "Vevey axle".<ref>{{cite web|work=La Vie du Rail, No. 1415, 4 November 1973|title= ÉCARTEMENTS VARIABLES: L' "ESSIEU MIRACLE" EST-IL NÉ DANS LE CANTON DE VAUD?|url=http://www.laviedurail.com|language=fr}}</ref> The design was subsequently obtained and improved by Construcciones y Auxiliar de Ferrocarriles (CAF).
 DB Cargo–Knorr-Bremse. being developed in 2002 for use between Europe and Russia.
 Japan Railways RTRI (from the Japan Railway Technical Research Institute) to be used on motorised axles.
 PKP SUW 2000 system produced by ZNTK Poznań for Polish State Railways.

Montreux-Oberland Bernois Railway (MOB), also developed by Prose of Winterthur in 2022 (/).

 Compatibility 
The variable gauge systems are not themselves all compatible. Only the SUW 2000 and Rafil Type V systems are interoperable, as are TALGO-RD and CAF-BRAVA.

In 2009, at Roda de Barà near Tarragona, a Unichanger capable of handling four different VGA systems was under development.

 International traffic 
VGA is particularly important with international railway traffic because gauge changes tend to occur more often at international borders.

 Features 
Different systems have different limitations, for example, some can be used on carriages and wagons only and are unsuitable for motive power, while others require that rolling stock is unloaded before going through the gauge changer.

 Speed Maximum 
The maximum speed of the trains equipped with the different technologies varies. Only CAF and Talgo produce high-speed VGA, allowing speeds up to 250 km/h.

 Speed Changing 
The Talgo RD GC changes gauge at a speed of 15 km/h (4.2 m/s) so a 100m train takes only 24 seconds to convert.

 Gauge changer 

A gauge changer is a device which forces the gauge adjustment in the wheels.  Designs consist of a pair of running rails that gradually vary in width between the two gauges, combined with other rails and levers to perform the following steps, using Talgo RD as an example:
 Verify that all vehicles in train are suitable for Gauge Change.
 Support on – takes weight off lock and on the guide rails.
 Unlock.
 Move wheels to new position.
 Relock. 
 Support off – put weight back on lock from the guide rails.
 Verify correct operation and generate statistics.  Use ECPB power and supervisory cables.

In the Spanish Talgo-RD system, a constant spray of water is used to lubricate the metal surfaces, to reduce heat and wear.

 Limitations 
The diameter of the wheels also limits the axleload to no more than 22.5 tonnes.

 Operation 
A variable gauge multiple unit, or a train including a variable gauge locomotive (e.g. Talgo 250) and rolling stock, may drive straight across a gauge changer. Normally the locomotive will not be able to change gauge, meaning that it must move out of the way whilst the remainder of the train itself passes through. On the opposite side, a new locomotive of the other gauge will couple to the train.

A train (or an individual car) can be pushed halfway across the gauge-changer, uncoupled, and then (once far enough across) coupled to the new locomotive and pulled the rest of the way. A long length of wire-rope with hooks on the end means that the process can be asynchronous, with the rope used to bridge across the length of the gauge changer (to temporarily couple the arriving cars and receiving locomotive, although without braking control from the locomotive to the train vehicles).

On long-distance trains in Spain and night trains crossing from Spain into France, the arriving locomotive stops just short of the gauge changer, uncouples and moves into a short siding out of the way. Gravity then moves the train through the gauge changer at a controlled low speed. The new locomotive is coupled onto the front only after the full train has finished passing through the changer.

From 2014 gauge changing systems for freight wagons were being developed.

 Countries 
 Australia 
In 1933, as many as 140 inventions  were offered to Australia railways to overcome the breaks of gauge between the different states. None was accepted. About 20 of these devices were adjustable wheels/axles of some kind or another, which may be analogous to the modern VGA. VGA systems were mostly intended for Broad Gauge and Standard Gauge lines.

Break of Gauge stations were installed at Port Pirie, Peterborough and Albury; these were fairly manual in operation.  The newest installation was at Dry Creek and was of a more automatic design. The Talgo RD design is even more automatic and efficient.

Belarus/Poland
A Talgo gauge changing facility is installed at Brest near the Belarusian-Polish border. It is used by Russian Railways' fast trains connecting Moscow and Berlin.

Orders for 7 Talgo VGA trainsets placed were placed in 2011. The trains under the brand "Strizh" are in service since 2016.

 Canada 
Variable gauge axles were used for a while on the Grand Trunk Railway in the 1860s in Canada to connect  and  standard gauge without transshipment. Five hundred vehicles were fitted with "adjustable gauge trucks" but following heavy day-in, day-out use the system proved unsatisfactory, particularly in cold and snowy weather. The system used telescoping axles with wide hubs that allowed the wheels to be squeezed or stretched apart through a gauge-changer, after holding pins had been manually released.

Railway operations over the Niagara Bridge were also complicated.

 China 
A patent with diagram (2006) (doesn't seem to say how brake shoes or disc brakes are changed as well)

 Finland/Sweden 
In 1999, a gauge-changer was installed at Tornio at the Finnish end of the dual-gauge section between Haparanda and Tornio, for use with variable gauge freight wagons. The Tornio gauge changer is a Rafil design from Germany; a similar Talgo-RD'' gauge changer at the Haparanda end used to exist, but was removed as it required de-icing in winter.

Train ferry traffic operated by SeaRail and arriving from Germany and Sweden by sea used bogie exchange facilities in the Port of Turku.

Georgia 
A new gauge changer has been put in place in Akhalkalaki for Baku-Tbilisi-Kars railway. Both bogie exchange and variable gauge adapters are provided.

Japan 

See .

The first-generation train was tested from 1998 to 2006, including on the US High-speed Test Track in 2002. A third-generation train has been undergoing reliability trials since 2014 in preparation for potential introduction to service on the planned Kyushu Shinkansen extension to Nagasaki.

Lithuania/Poland
A gauge changing facility of the Polish SUW 2000 system is installed at Mockava north of the Lithuanian-Polish border. VGA passenger trains between Lithuania and Poland were running between October 1999 and May 2005, and VGA goods trains between early 2000s and 2009.

Poland/Ukraine 
There are two gauge changing facilities of the Polish SUW 2000 system installed on the Polish-Ukrainian border, one of them in Dorohusk (Poland) on the Warsaw-Kiyv line, another in Mostyska (Ukraine) on the Kraków-Lviv line. On 14 December 2003 VGA passenger trains were introduced between Kraków (Poland) and Lviv (Ukraine) instead of bogie exchange. VGA saves about 3 hours compared to truck exchange. The trains last ran in 2016.

Spain 
Spain is the largest user of variable gauge systems. This is because of the need to connect older mainlines built to Iberian gauge and extensive new high-speed railway lines and connections to France, using the standard gauge. Two gauge changes are installed on lines to France and at all entrances/exits leading between the high-speed network and older lines. There are also significant lengths of  secondary lines but these are not connected to the main network.

In February 2004, RENFE placed orders for:
  Forty-five CAF/Alstom 25 kV AC/3 kV DC, variable gauge EMUs for 250 km/h regional services, between October 2006 and May 2009 (€580 million)
 Olmedo to Medina del Campo in Valladolid, Spanish test track.
 November 2008 – High Speed trainset for Cadiz to Warsaw.
 July 2009 – Talgo 250 supplied with Voith Turbo SZH-692 gauge change final drives.

There is also a  circular test track in Spain.

Switzerland 

Variable gauge axles are implemented on the Montreux–Gstaad–Zweisimmen–Spiez–Interlaken line. A trial bogie has been built and tested. It has no axles which allow the bogie half frames holding the wheels on both sides to slide sideways to each other. The EV09-Prose gauge changer at Zweisimmen was satisfactorily tested on 19 June 2019. The system has been designed to allow operation on both Montreux Oberland Bernois Railway’s (MOB) 1000mm gauge line and BLS AG 1435mm gauge infrastructure.

United Kingdom 
John Fowler mentions in 1886 at attempt by the GWR to develop a "telescopical" axle.

Trams ran between Leeds and Bradford ( gauge) following a successful trial in 1906 using Bradford tram car number 124. The system was later patented by – GB190601695 (A) of 1906. This system was improved again in patent GB190919655 (A) of 1909 by introducing a locking system acting on the wheel and axle rather than just the wheel rim. This provided a more effective grip where the wheel was free to move along the splined axle.

Comparison with bogie exchange

Time taken 
In VGA, the train is pulled through the "adjuster" at about  without any need to uncouple the wagons or disconnect (and test) the brake equipment. Alternatively, as the train need not be uncoupled, the locomotive may pull the coupled carriages all together.

See Talgo Gauge Changer.

Locomotives 
Steam locomotive are generally not gauge convertible on-the-fly. While diesel locomotives can be truck exchanged, this is not normally done owing to the complexity in the reconnection of cables and hoses. In Australia, some locomotives are transferred between gauges. The transfer might happen every few months, but not for an individual trip.

By 2004, variable gauge electric passenger locomotives were available from Talgo. It is not clear if variable gauge freight locomotives are available.

Electric 
 L-9202 is an experimental high speed Bo-Bo dual voltage (3 kV DC/25 kV AC) VGA locomotive.
 Talgo 250 locomotives were also planned to haul dual-voltage variable-gauge trainsets from Montpellier  from the border to Barcelona and Madrid. Two Talgo 250 power cars haul 11 passenger trailer cars.
 EMU

Weight 
 A gauge adjustable truck complete with wheelsets weighs a total of about one ton/tonne more than a conventional truck and normally must use disc brakes, which cool more slowly.

History 
 1915. C. W. Prosser. – Argus
 1921. C. R. Prosser. – Argus Friday 8 July 1921
 1922. J. Grieve. – Argus 19 July 1922

See also 

 Alvia
 Axle exchange
 Bogie exchange
 Bradford Corporation Tramways
 Dual couplings
 Gauge Change Train (Japan)
 Interoperability
 Ramsey car-transfer apparatus
 Strizh
 SUW 2000 a form of VGA

References

Further reading

External links 
 A train axle system with variable gauge wheels, patent EP1112908, assigned to Talgo SA.
 Variable gauge bogie for rolling stock, patent EP0873929, assigned to Railway Technical Research Institute.
 Railway axle assembly furnished with automatic change of track gauge and adaptable to conventional freight bogies, patent US5787814, assigned to Talgo SA.

 Variable-Gauge Wagon Wheelsets – Brief Article, International Railway Journal,  July, 1999
 European Automatic Track Gauge Changeover Systems, UIC-backed study of different variable gauge systems
 Talgo's variable gauge system explained (in French)
 Talgo's Variable gauge system in action
 Close-up view of MOB's variable bogie in action
 UA report
 CFR
 http://osjd.plaske.ua/en/doklad/wishnevski.doc
 Ukraine
 Automatic gauge changing systems in Spain 

Track gauges
Rolling stock
Vehicle technology
International rail transport